TTU may refer to any of the following:

College or university

United States
 Tennessee Technological University
 Tennessee Temple University
 Texas Tech University

Other countries
 Tallinn University of Technology, formerly known as Tallinn Technical University
 Tatung University, a university in Taiwan
 TTÜ KK, a professional basketball club associated with Tallinn University of Technology
 Tafila Technical University, a public university in Jordan
Thanlyin Technological University, a technical university in Myanmar

Other
Tanzania Teachers’ Union, a trade union in Tanzania
 Timed Text Unit, used in MPEG-4 Part 17
 TTUSB, a turntable